Quintuguenu the Mapuche Toqui in the Arauco War elected in 1591 following the death of the old toqui Guanoalca.  He was killed in battle the same year. Paillaeco was elected as his successor in 1592.

Sources 
  The Geographical, Natural, and Civil History of Chili By Don Juan Ignatius Molina, Longman, Hurst, Rees, and Orme, Paternoster-Row, London, 1809
  José Ignacio Víctor Eyzaguirre, Historia eclesiastica: Politica y literaria de Chile, IMPRENTA DEL COMERCIO, VALPARAISO, June 1830 List of Toquis, pg. 162-163, 498-500.

1591 deaths
16th-century Mapuche people
Indigenous leaders of the Americas
People of the Arauco War
Military personnel killed in action
Year of birth unknown